"Memory Motel" is a ballad song from English rock band the Rolling Stones' 1976 album Black and Blue. The song is credited to singer Mick Jagger and guitarist Keith Richards (named Richard at the time). It's one of the few which feature both members sharing lead vocals. The song is more than seven minutes long, one of the longest by the Rolling Stones.

Jagger began writing the song before beginning the Stones' Tour of the Americas '75 while staying with Richards at Andy Warhol's house in Montauk, New York and finished it while on tour. This is reflected in the song's lyrics where Jagger describes having to leave for Baton Rouge, where the Stones played two warm up shows at Louisiana State University, and where he describes subsequent experiences on the road.

The title comes from an actual motel in Montauk, on Long Island. The lyrics to the song have long drawn speculation as to who the "Hannah baby" in the lyrics refer to. Carly Simon is often a name considered, due to Jagger's descriptions of the woman throughout the song. Jagger describes her thus:

The lyrics talk of the fading love brought on by a one-night stand at said motel. The song describes the female subject as a strong, independent woman, comparable in many ways to the female subject of "Ruby Tuesday", with Richards repeated refrain:

Richards did not play guitar on the track, but contributed co-lead vocals alongside Jagger; Black and Blue has long been known as the album used to find a replacement for lead guitarist Mick Taylor, who left right before work was to begin on it. Harvey Mandel plays electric guitar while Wayne Perkins performs acoustic. Jagger, Richards, and Billy Preston play acoustic piano, electric piano, and string synthesizer on the song, respectively. Preston also contributes backing vocals along with Ron Wood, who would eventually become the Stones' rhythm guitarist. The song was recorded in Munich, Germany at Musicland Studios in March and April 1975. Overdubs and re-recordings were performed later in the year.

A live version appeared on the Stones' 1998 live album No Security, where Dave Matthews took up lead vocals with Jagger and Richards. The song has been played on every tour since the 1994 Voodoo Lounge Tour.

For an episode of the 1990 TV music show Beyond The Groove by Jagger collaborator David A. Stewart, Jagger recorded a version of "Memory Motel" without Richards.

James Patterson and Peter de Jonge, in their 2002 thriller The Beach House, include a scene set in the Memory Motel and its bar, and refer to the Stones song.

References

External links
Complete Official Lyrics

Songs about hotels and motels
Songs about casual sex
The Rolling Stones songs
British soul songs
1976 songs
Songs written by Jagger–Richards
Song recordings produced by Jagger–Richards